WCMI may refer to:

 WCMI (AM), a radio station (1340 AM) licensed to Ashland, Kentucky, United States
 WCMI-FM, a radio station (92.7 FM) licensed to Catlettsburg, Kentucky, United States